Makonde District is a district in Zimbabwe.

Location
The district is located in Mashonaland West Province, in north central Zimbabwe.

Overview
Makonde District is a farming district. Crops grown here include cotton, maize and tobacco. Cattle are also  raised in the district for dairy products and beef on a commercial basis. Mining of copper also takes place.

Chinhoyi, the district headquarters is a college town, hosting two major universities, namely: Chinhoyi University of Technology (CUT) and Zimbabwe Open University (ZOU). There are three major high schools; Chinhoyi High School, Nemakonde High School and Lomagundi College. In addition the district is home to numerous primary schools.

Population
The current population of Makonde District is not publicly known. In 2010, the district population was estimated at 167,436 people. The next national population census in Zimbabwe is scheduled from 18 August 2012 through 28 August 2012.

See also
 Districts of Zimbabwe
 Provinces of Zimbabwe

References

 
Districts of Mashonaland West Province